Bar'am National Park is a national park in Israel, between kibbutz Sasa and moshav Dovev, near the Lebanese border. On the grounds of the park is a synagogue from the Talmudic period.

The original name of the village in which the synagogue was found is unknown, but it is indicative of the existence of an established Jewish community in the area it was found.

See also
 Kfar Bar'am

References

External links
 Bar'am National Park - official site

National parks of Israel
Protected areas of Northern District (Israel)
Buildings and structures in Northern District (Israel)
Ancient synagogues in the Land of Israel